Hobble Creek is an unincorporated area and census-designated place (CDP) in Utah County, Utah, United States. It was first listed as a CDP prior to the 2020 census.

It is in the eastern part of the county, in the valley of Hobble Creek, a west-flowing tributary of Utah Lake, and its Left Fork, which flows from north to south. The entire CDP is within the Wasatch–Cache National Forest.

References 

Populated places in Utah County, Utah
Census-designated places in Utah County, Utah
Census-designated places in Utah